Margetts is a surname. Notable people with the surname include:

Dean Margetts (born 1974), Australian rules football field umpire
Dee Margetts (born 1955), Australian politician
Helen Margetts (born 1961), British political scientist
Jonny Margetts (born 1993), English footballer
Matt Margetts (born 1988), Canadian freestyle skier
Jade Margetts (born 2001), International supermodel

See also
Bob Margett (born 1929), American politician